Fort Abercrombie State Historical Park, also known as the Fort Abercrombie State Historic Site, is an Alaska state park on Kodiak Island, Alaska.  It includes  of land at the end of Miller Point, located on the eastern shore of Kodiak Island northeast of the city of Kodiak.    The park, established in 1969, is noted for its historical World War II fortifications and its scenery, which includes bluffs overlooking the ocean, spruce forests, and meadows.  The site was named in honor of the early Alaska explorer and United States Army officer Lt. Col. William R. Abercrombie.  The fortifications, whose surviving elements include gun emplacements, underground magazines, and foundational remnants of buildings, were built in 1941 and abandoned after the war ended, having seen no action.

The park was listed on the National Register of Historic Places in 1970, and was included in the National Historic Landmark designation of the Kodiak Naval Operating Base and Forts Greely and Abercrombie in 1985.

Park facilities include a campground (best suited for tent camping as the park's narrow and winding roads make RV access difficult), a group camping area, a picnic area, and hiking trails.

Kodiak Military History Museum 
The Kodiak Military History Museum is a private military museum located in Fort Abercrombie State Historical Park.  The museum is located in the restored Ready Ammunition bunker on Miller Point.

See also
National Register of Historic Places listings in Kodiak Island Borough, Alaska
List of National Historic Landmarks in Alaska

References

External links
 Fort Abercrombie State Historical Park (official site)
 Fort Abercrombie, at Crusty old Joe's Kodiak Alaska Military History
 Kodiak Military History Museum

Abercrombie
Buildings and structures in Kodiak Island Borough, Alaska
Abercrombie
Military and war museums in Alaska
Museums in Kodiak Island Borough, Alaska
Protected areas of Kodiak Island Borough, Alaska
State parks of Alaska
Tourist attractions in Kodiak Island Borough, Alaska
World War II on the National Register of Historic Places in Alaska
Buildings and structures on the National Register of Historic Places in Kodiak Island Borough, Alaska
Parks on the National Register of Historic Places in Alaska
1941 establishments in Alaska